Francisco Quintero Nava (8 March 1923 in Guadalajara, Mexico – 10 March 1979) was a Mexican football player. He was a goalkeeper for Club Deportivo Guadalajara (Chivas) and represented Mexico at the 1948 Summer Olympics in London. Among his teammates was Antonio Carbajal.
He is the grandfather of current goalkeeper for the Atlanta Silverbacks, Felipe Quintero Monsivais.

See also
 Club Deportivo Guadalajara

References

External links
 List of Mexican players at the 1948 Olympics in London. (Spanish)
 Descendants of Francisco Quintero playing football (soccer). (Spanish)
 Felipe Quintero is descendant of six Mexican goalkeepers, starting with Francisco Quintero

1923 births
1979 deaths
Association football goalkeepers
Olympic footballers of Mexico
Footballers at the 1948 Summer Olympics
Sportspeople from Guadalajara, Jalisco
Footballers from Jalisco
C.D. Guadalajara footballers
Mexican footballers